is a Japanese synchronised swimmer.

Yumi competed in the women's team event the 2012 Summer Olympics, and the 2009, 2011 and 2013 World Aquatics Championships. She retired after the 2013 World Aquatics Championships.

References

External links

 
 
 

1989 births
Living people
Japanese synchronized swimmers
Olympic synchronized swimmers of Japan
Synchronized swimmers at the 2012 Summer Olympics
Asian Games medalists in artistic swimming
Asian Games silver medalists for Japan
Artistic swimmers at the 2010 Asian Games
Medalists at the 2010 Asian Games
World Aquatics Championships medalists in synchronised swimming
Synchronized swimmers at the 2015 World Aquatics Championships
Artistic swimmers at the 2019 World Aquatics Championships
Sportspeople from Saitama (city)
21st-century Japanese women